Letiefesse is a town in the Soubakaniédougou Department of Comoé Province in southwestern Burkina Faso. The town has a population of 1,636.

References

Populated places in the Cascades Region
Comoé Province